Orlando Lansdorf (1965 – 6 March 2021) was a Surinamese-Dutch drag queen and HIV activist who received media attention in the Netherlands.

Landsdorf was born in Paramaribo, Suriname. He moved to Veghel in the Netherlands. Landsdorf was the father of two children with a lesbian mother. In the 1990s, he was active in Safe Seks Guerrilla, a performance group to raise awareness of HIV, and to promote safe sex. Later, he was diagnosed HIV positive himself. He worked as a bartender at Café 't Mandje on the Zeedijk in Amsterdam. Lansdorf died in his sleep on 6 March 2021, aged 55.

References

External links
Personal website (in English and Dutch)

1965 births
2021 deaths
Dutch drag queens
Gay entertainers
Surinamese LGBT people
HIV/AIDS activists
People with HIV/AIDS
People from Paramaribo
Place of death missing
Surinamese emigrants to the Netherlands